Ballard may refer to:

People 
Ballard (surname), a surname (including a list of people with the name)

Places

Australia 

Ballard, Queensland, a locality in the Lockyer Valley Region

Ireland 

Ballard, Ardnurcher, a townland in Ardnurcher civil parish, barony of Moycashel, County Westmeath
Ballard, County Clare, a townland
Ballard, Portloman, a townland in Portloman civil parish, barony of Corkaree, County Westmeath
Ballard, Rathconrath, a townland in Rathconrath civil parish, barony of Rathconrath, County Westmeath

United Kingdom 

Ballard Down, an area in Dorset, England
Ballard, County Armagh, a townland in Northern Ireland

United States 

Ballard, California, a town in the Santa Ynez Valley
Ballard, Kentucky, an unincorporated community
Ballard, Missouri, an unincorporated community in Bates County
Ballard, Seattle, a neighborhood that was once a city before being annexed by Seattle, Washington
Ballard, Utah, a town in Uintah County
Ballard, West Virginia, an unincorporated community in Monroe County
Ballard County, Kentucky
Ballardvale, Massachusetts, a village in the town of Andover, Essex County

Schools
Ballard High School (Louisville), Kentucky, US
Ballard High School (Seattle), Washington, US
Ballard Community School District, Iowa, US

Other uses
Ballard Power Systems, noted for their fuel cell research
 USS Ballard (DD-267), a Clemson-class destroyer, commissioned in 1919 and decommissioned in 1945
Ballard Institute and Museum of Puppetry, in Storrs, Connecticut

See also
Ballad (disambiguation)
Bollard (disambiguation)